Brase is a German surname. Notable people with the surname include:

 Chris Brase (born 1962), American politician
 Fritz Brase (1875–1940), German military musician and composer resident in Ireland
 Hans Brase (born 1993), American-German basketball player
 Matt Brase (born 1982), American basketball player and coach
 Willi Brase (born 1951), German politician
 Wolfgang Brase (born 1939), German footballer

See also
 Braase, another surname

German-language surnames